Alejandro Schiavio (born 28 January 1961) is an Argentinian former rugby union flanker. He is currently the chairman of Club Pueyrredón, where he played for all his career.

Career
He spent all of his career playing for Club Pueyrredón. He was first capped for Argentina  
in the match against Chile, in Buenos Aires, on 16 June 1983. He was also called up for the 1987 Rugby World Cup, where he played all the three matches of the pool stage against Fiji, Italy and New Zealand, the latter being his last international cap, earning 6 caps in total.

Notes

External links

1961 births
Living people
Argentine rugby union players
Rugby union flankers
Argentina international rugby union players